Bakr Awa is a tell, or archaeological settlement mound, in Iraq. It is located near Halabja in the Shahrizor Plain in Iraqi Kurdistan.

Archaeology
The site was first investigated in 1927 by Ephraim Speiser as part of a more general study of the area. Speiser proposed identifying the site as Atlila, which was subsequently renamed to Dur-Assur.
 Subsequent excavations took place in 1960 and 1961 by archaeologists from the Iraqi Directorate-General of Antiquities. Three small cuneiform tablets were found. The excavators mentioned that they expanded a trench dug by George Martin Lees 40 years before. In 2009 the site was surveyed. New excavations were started in 2010, with subsequent seasons taking place in 2011, 2013, and 2014. The survey and the 2010-2014 excavations were undertaken by a team from the University of Heidelberg.

History
This region is thought to have been part of the kingdom of the Lullubi.

Early Bronze
The oldest excavated layers date to the third millennium BC and are contemporary with the Jemdet Nasr and Early Dynastic periods. A small temple dates to the Akkadian period.

Middle Bronze
Large houses and tombs were recovered from the second millennium BC occupation layers.

Late Bronze
Occupation continued into the Late Bronze Age. Material culture from these layers showed links with the Hurrian and Kassite cultures.

Iron Age
Iron Age occupation at Bakr Awa dates to the Neo-Assyrian period and the Achaemenid Empire. A Sassanian occupation at Bakr Awa is likely, but hasn't been proven beyond doubt. Islamic period occupation ranges from the Abbasid period into the Ottoman period. The site continues to be occupied today. It has been proposed as the site of the Neo-Assyrian town Dur-Aššur (renamed from Atlila).

Economy
In the Early Dynastic period, the economy was nomadic and based on sheep and goat (74.1%), mainly killed for meat. There were also remains of cattle and more rarely equids.

In the Akkadian period, the economy shifted from nomadic to more sedentary and pastoral, introducing new elements as pig and poultry breeding as well as wild animal hunting.

Recent changes
The mound and its surrounding areas were lastly excavated in 2014. A recent visit to the site revealed innumerable pits; the telltale "pockmarks" at a looted site which algorithms can recognize and flag as suspicious.

Gallery

See also
Cities of the ancient Near East

References

Further reading

External links
Cuneiform tablets from Bakr Awa - University of Tubingen

Sulaymaniyah Governorate
Archaeological sites in Iraq
Tells (archaeology)
Ancient Assyrian cities